The General Service Enlistment Act of 1856 was passed by the British Parliament in 1856. It required every Indian soldier to go overseas for deployment if required. The Act was brought just before the Anglo-Persian War. The British were reluctant to send a force overland to Herat, reminiscent of the disasters of the first Anglo Afghan War. So instead, the Government in India decided to launch a maritime expeditionary force to attack the general area of Bushehr, the primary port of entry into Persia at the time. For this reason Lord Canning, the Governor-General of India, decided to pass the Act that forced deployment literally overseas, as he was aware of the resistance he would face because of the Kala pani taboo. It was thus one of the main causes for the Great Uprising of 1857.

References 

Military of British India
1856 in India
Resistance to the British Empire